Hiramatsu is a Japanese surname. Notable people with the surname include:

, Japanese voice actress
, Japanese footballer
, Japanese figure skater
, Japanese academic administrator
, Japanese footballer
, Japanese politician
, Japanese former professional baseball pitcher
, Japanese politician
, Japanese Nihonga painter
, Japanese football player
, Japanese artist
, Japanese high jumper

See also
Hiramatsu Station, a railway station in Himeji, Hyōgo Prefecture, Japan

Japanese-language surnames